Bird on a Wire is the second full-length studio album released by Lava recording artist Toby Lightman. The album peaked at No. 30 on Billboard's Heatseekers Albums chart on 11 August 2006.

Critical reception

Candace L. of Okayplayer begins her review with, "The sophomore effort from Toby Lightman is an exciting mix of country blues, rock and R&B.; Filled with insightful lyrics and mature pop, Lightman refuses to be pigeonholed by her teenybopper appearance, skillfully genre-jumping with the confidence of a veteran"

Marisa Brown of AllMusic writes, "Bird on a Wire'''s an impressive piece of work from a talented artist who's grown completely into her voice and herself, subtly complex while still retaining the passion and immediacy that makes it such a good listen, touching listeners emotionally as well as intellectually, a feat that's truly hard to attain and absolutely deserves to be praised."

Mike Joseph of PopMatters says, "Bird on a Wire, Lightman’s sophomore effort, doesn’t deviate much from the formula of her debut. Most of the songs sound tailor-made for adult alternative radio. They have a mature, yet still pop-friendly sound. Again, some of the songs have a pronounced R&B element."

See original reviews for full articles. Links can be found in the references section of this article.

Track listing

Musicians
Bill Bottrell – bells, chimes, e-bow, acoustic guitar, electric guitar, drum loops, mellotron, moog synthesizer, organ, pedal steel guitar, piano, string arrangements, synthesizer, Wurlitzer
Paul Bushnell – bass guitar
Caroline Campbell – violin
James Freebarin-Smith – cello
Neel Hammond – violin
Joseph Hanna – drums, percussion
Patrick Leonard – keyboards, lap steel guitar, piano, programming
Toby Lightman – dobro, acoustic guitar, electric guitar, lap steel guitar, string arrangements, lead vocals, background vocals
Brian Macleod – drums, percussion
Justin Meldal-Johnsen – bass guitar
Wendy Melvoin – bass guitar, electric guitar
Han Oh – viola
Tim Pierce – dobro, e-bow, acoustic guitar, electric guitar, mandolin
Dan Schwartz – bass guitar
Shari Freebairn Smith – violin
Lyle Workman – electric guitar

Production
A&R Direction – Andy Karp
Engineer – Michael Perfitt
Product Manager – Gregg Nadel
Art Direction, Illustration & Design – Mark Obriski
Art Producer, Photography – Andrew Zaeh
Packaging Manager – Nick Romei
Engineer – Michael Perfitt
Mastering – Scott Hull
Mixing – Kevin Killen

Track information and credits verified from the album's liner notes. Some information was adapted from Discogs and AllMusic''.

References

External links
Toby Lightman Official Site
Lava Records Official Site

2006 albums
Albums produced by Bill Bottrell
Albums produced by Patrick Leonard
Lava Records albums
Toby Lightman albums